Hamzanlu (also Romanized as Ḩamzānlū) is a village in Aladagh Rural District, in the Central District of Bojnord County, North Khorasan Province, Iran. At the 2006 census, its population was 417, in 102 families.

References 

Populated places in Bojnord County